Michael Blagievsky (birth name: Michael Ioannovich Kobozev; Russian: Михаил Иоаннович Кобозев) (February 4, 1874, Spas-Leonovschina, Moscow Governorate – December 23, 1937, Ryazhsk, Ryazan Oblast) was a Russian archpriest executed by the Bolsheviks and canonized by the Russian Orthodox Church in 2005 as a new martyr.

Biography 
Michael Ivanovich Kobozev was born in 1874 in the village of Spas-Leonovschina, Egorievsky Uyezd, Moscow Governorate, to the deacon of the Church of Transfiguration Ioann (Ivan) Lvovich Kobozev. In 1892 he finished Skopin theological school with the qualifications to enter Ryazanian seminary. However, he went into teaching and worked as an intern tutor at the parochial school of the village of Dimovo, Skopin Uyezd. In 1894 he received a primary school teacher’s certificate and started work at the parochial school of the Murzinka village, Skopin Uyezd, Ryazan Governorate. In 1897 he got a certificate of a worship vocalist. 

In 1898 he was raised to deacon and commissioned to the village of Blagie, Ranenburg Uyezd, Ryazan governorate. There he taught the Bible at the local parochial school.

In 1910 he was commissioned to the Church of Ascension in Ranenburg. In 1913 he was appointed to teach the Bible at the Luchinskoe school. For his good teaching work he was awarded with a silver medal. Soon after he was raised to priest. After the Revolution, in the building across the Church of Ascension the Bolsheviks founded their office. Soon the church was closed down. In 1932 Michael Kobozev was transferred to the village of Dmitrievsky Borovok, Novo-Derevensky district, and left the family in Ranenburg. In 1933 he was raised to protopriest. In 1937 many priests of the district were arrested. Michael Kobozev was arrested on October 26, 1937. 

Michael Kobozev was accused of anti-Soviet counter-revolutionary activity. On  December 6, 1937 Priest Michael Kobozev was sentenced to be shot. He was executed on December 23, 1937 at the prison of Ryazhsk. The actual burial place in unknown. 

By the decision of the Presidium of the USSR Supreme Soviet, Michael Kobozev was exonerated on January 16, 1989.

Family 
His family avoided repressions. His elder son, Nikolay, as a teacher at the Red Army, had to be present during his father’s arrest.  Due to emotional trauma he soon   left the Red Army and often changed places of residence fearing repressions. 

Siblings: Dmitry, Maria. 

Spouse: Sofia Nikolayevna (d. 1956)

Children: Nikolay (b. 1900, teacher, served in the Red Army), Ivan (b. 1901, died in Stalingrad in action), Michael (b. 1915; a veteran of the WWII, worked as a driver), Vera (b. 1903), Antonina (b. 1904, both teachers), Kapitalina (b. 1906) and Anna (b. 1910, nursery teacher).

Canonization 
Upon the initiative of the Ryazan Diocese, on July 16, 2005, Protopriest Michael Kobozev was canonized as a saint of the Russian Orthodox Church and added in the Synaxis of Russian new martyrs and confessors of the 20th century as Michael Blagievsky, after the name of the village where he once served. 

In summer 2009, on the façade of the house where he lived in Ranenburg there was set a memorial plate. 

The feast day is December 23, the day he was executed.

References 

Russian saints
Russian saints of the Eastern Orthodox Church
Victims of Red Terror in Soviet Russia
20th-century Eastern Orthodox martyrs
1874 births
1937 deaths
People from Moscow Governorate
People from Chaplygin
People executed by the Soviet Union by firearm